Yuen Long Industrial Estate (branded as ) is an industrial estate in Yuen Long District, New Territories, Hong Kong. It is at the north of Yuen Long Town and opposite to Nam Sang Wai across Shan Pui River. It is administered by the Hong Kong Science and Technology Parks Corporation.

See also

 Wang Chau (Yuen Long)
 Fung Lok Wai

Wang Chau (Yuen Long)
Manufacturing in Hong Kong
Industrial estates in Hong Kong
Yuen Long District